was a Japanese amusement ride company that built roller coasters, giant wheels, carousels, flumes, dark rides, sky cycles and other amusement rides.

History

In 1935 Mr. Teiichi Yamada founded the Toyo Gorakuki Company and built his first attraction, a five-foot mechanical walking elephant that was a popular attraction at one of Tokyo's neighborhood parks. Yamada reorganized his company in 1949 and changed the name to TOGO. TOGO built its first roller coaster in 1953, at Hanayashiki Park in Tokyo. That coaster is still in operation and is the oldest coaster in Japan.

In 1965 TOGO built Cyclone at Toshimaen Park, which at the time, was the largest coaster in Asia. The company also began to expand its export business, selling coasters in Russia, Cuba and China. Although the company built a variety of different rides in Japan, its export business was primarily roller coasters. In 1979, TOGO installed standup trains on two of its existing coasters in Japan, Momonga Standing and Loop Coaster at Yomiuriland and Dangai at Thrill Valley, creating the world's first stand-up roller coasters. These two installations captured the attention of Taft/Kings Entertainment company, who then purchased TOGO's Astro-Comet, the world's first coaster designed from the ground up as a stand-up roller coaster, installing at Kings Island as King Cobra.

In 1986 TOGO developed the Ultra Twister Coaster. This unique concept had rails on the side of the vehicle allowing the coaster to perform true heartline rolls as it navigated the course. TOGO also incorporated a vertical lift hill and near-vertical drop into the ride. TOGO built seven of these models, all similar, but not identical to each other. The original versions were not capable of making turns, so all seven operated as shuttles. However, TOGO did display a full-circuit model at the IAAPA trade show in the mid-1990s that was capable of making turns, but the ride was never built.  In the fall of 1989, Arrow Dynamics began building a similar concept called the Pipeline, which failed to get past the prototype stage.

TOGO went bankrupt in 2001 due to a lawsuit by Knott's Berry Farm for problems with their Windjammer Surf Racers roller coaster. TOGO created several unique coasters, including its combination of a looping sit-down coaster and a hypercoaster with its Manhattan Express coaster in Las Vegas (now known as "The Big Apple Coaster"). The looping wild mouse by TOGO was a style of ride with a drop into a vertical loop, followed by the hairpin turns and drops of a wild mouse coaster. The former Windjammer coaster at Knott's berry Farm was a variation of the looping wild mouse; it didn't feature any hairpin turns.

TOGO is also renowned for inventing the Twist-and-Dive roll, an inversion maneuver that combines elements of a half-heartline roll with a half-loop. A version of this maneuver included a half-oblique loop instead of a half-loop, so riders exited the element at an angle. This was used on the now-defunct Viper at Six Flags Great Adventure.

In 2018, TOGO announced a possible comeback after releasing a concept of their new stand up coaster model.

Notable rides
Bandit at Yomiuriland – It was the tallest and fastest roller coaster in the world when it opened in 1988 and inspired Richard Kinzel of Cedar Point to build Magnum XL 200.
Big Apple Coaster at New York-New York Hotel & Casino (first opened in 1997 as the "Manhattan Express").
Freestyle is a stand-up roller coaster operating at Cavallino Matto in Tuscany, Italy. It opened as the park's fifth roller coaster on 18 July 2015. Freestyle originally opened at Canada's Wonderland in 1985 as SkyRider
Fujiyama – A hypercoaster at Fuji-Q Highland, Japan. Until 2000, it was the tallest roller coaster in the world.
King Cobra at Kings Island (1984–2001) – The world's first coaster designed specifically to be a stand-up looping coaster. It was taken down and scrapped after TOGO went out of business, making parts very expensive.
Shockwave – Kings Dominion, Doswell, Virginia. Built in 1986 Specifically for Kings Dominion, was retired August 9, 2015.
SkyRider – Canada's Wonderland Opening date May 1985, retired in 2014 dismantled and sent to Italy.
Ultra Twister – A pipeline roller coaster that uses single cars that ride between the rails. Because of the design, the cars are unable to make lateral turns and require switch tracks at either end of the ride.
Viper at Six Flags Great Adventure – A roller coaster that featured a unique heartline roll. The ride was scrapped in 2005, and its station was re-used for El Toro.
White Canyon at Yomiuriland – White Canyon was the tallest and longest Cyclone-style roller coaster in the world before it closed in 2013.
Windjammer Surf Racers at Knott's Berry Farm – a twin racing coaster with 65-foot vertical loops. This coaster was a massive failure, and part of the lawsuits would lead to TOGO's bankruptcy.

List of roller coasters

As of 2019, TOGO has built 61 roller coasters around the world.

References

Roller coaster manufacturers
Manufacturing companies of Japan
Manufacturing companies established in 1935
Manufacturing companies disestablished in 2001
Japanese companies established in 1935
Japanese companies disestablished in 2001
American companies established in 1991
American companies disestablished in 2001
Middletown, Ohio
Companies that have filed for Chapter 7 bankruptcy